O Porriño (historically known in English as ) is a municipality in Galicia, Spain in the province of Pontevedra.

An industrial town, in the Vigo metropolitan area, it is an important economic dependency.

From O Porriño came the architect Antonio Palacios, known for the use of granite in his work, such as the Telecommunications Palace in Madrid, the García Barbón Theater in Vigo, or Porrino Town Hall amongst others.

It is the home town of the Sporting Lisboa woman basketball team player Andrea Pérez Alonso.

On 9 September 2016, a Portuguese train travelling from Vigo to Porto derailed near O Porriño railway station, killing the driver and at least three other people on board.

Parroquias
The municipality is formed of eight parroquias (parishes)

 Atios (Santa Baia)
 Budiño, O Porriño (San Salvador)
 Cans (Santo Estevo)
 Chenlo (San Xoán)
 Mosende (San Diego)
 Pontellas (Santiago)
 O Porriño (Santa María) 
 Torneiros (San Salvador)

Notable people

 Antonio Palacios, architect (1872–1945)

See also
 List of municipalities in Spain
 Vigo

References

External links

Porriño - Tourism Rias Baixas
Councillorship for Culture of O Porriño
Culture web of O Porriño

Porrino, O